Donald Neil Johnston (February 4, 1929 – September 28, 1978) was an American basketball player and coach. A center, Johnston played in the National Basketball Association (NBA) from 1951 to 1959. He was a member of the Philadelphia Warriors for his entire career. Known for his hook shot, Johnston was a six-time NBA All-Star; he led the NBA in scoring three times and led the league in rebounding once. He won an NBA championship with the Warriors in 1956. After his playing career ended due to a knee injury, Johnston coached in the NBA, in other professional basketball leagues, and at the collegiate level. He was inducted into the Naismith Memorial Basketball Hall of Fame as a player in 1990.

Early life
Johnston was born on February 4, 1929. He was a 1946 graduate of Chillicothe High School in Chillicothe, Ohio, where he was an all-state player in basketball. He led the Red Devils to an undefeated 16-0 regular season and ranked second in Ohio in 1945-46 as the team won its finale 82-19 behind Johnston's 38 points. He averaged 23.7 per game that year, playing only about half of some games. The team was upset in their second postseason game.  Johnston was named second team All-Ohio Associated Press Class A (large school). He was also a high jumper on the track team and qualified for the state track meet and he was on the tennis team.

Johnston attended Ohio State University, where he played both baseball and basketball.

Johnston signed a professional baseball contract with the Philadelphia Phillies after two years of college. After failing to distinguish himself in minor league baseball, he tried out for the NBA's Philadelphia Warriors at the team camp in Hershey, Pennsylvania in 1951 and was signed to a contract.

Professional basketball career
Johnston played for the Philadelphia Warriors from 1951 to 1959. He spent his entire playing career with the Warriors. The 6'8" Johnston was known for his sweeping right-handed hook shot.

Johnston led the NBA in scoring for three consecutive seasons: 1952–53, 1953–54, and 1954–55. During the 1954–55 season, he also won the league's rebounding title. He led the league in field goal percentage in the 1952–53, 1955–56, and 1956–57 seasons. 

Johnston was a member of the Warriors' NBA championship-winning 1956 team. He played in six NBA All-Star Games, was an All-NBA First Team selection four times, and was an All-NBA Second Team selection once.

Johnston was forced to retire after the 1958–59 season due to a knee injury. During his eight-year career, he averaged 19.4 points per game, 11.5 rebounds and 2.5 assists, with a field goal percentage of .444 and a free throw percentage of .768.

Coaching career
After his playing career ended, Johnston was head coach of the Philadelphia Warriors during the 1959–60 and 1960–61 seasons before resigning. Johnston coached the Warriors during the first two seasons of Wilt Chamberlain's NBA career, compiling a record of 95-59. He also worked as an assistant coach under Jack McCloskey with the Portland Trail Blazers and at Wake Forest University. 

Johnston coached the Pittsburgh Rens of the American Basketball League and the Wilmington Blue Bombers of the Eastern Basketball League; in addition, he coached at Chemeketa Community College. His last job was as athletic director at North Lake College in Irving, Texas.

Death and legacy
On September 28, 1978, Johnston died of a heart attack at age 49 while playing basketball with his son, Scott, in Bedford, Texas. A memorial service was held at North Lake College and at St. Paul's Methodist Church in Hurst, Texas. He was survived by his wife, Phyllis (Wilson); three daughters, Nancy, Barbara and Kay; and twin sons Daniel and Scott; and three brothers.

In 1980, Johnston was inducted into the Pennsylvania Sports Hall of Fame. In 1990, he was enshrined in the Naismith Memorial Basketball Hall of Fame and the Ohio Basketball Hall of Fame. Johnston was inducted into the National Collegiate Basketball Hall of Fame in 2006.

NBA career statistics

Regular season

Playoffs

See also
 List of individual National Basketball Association scoring leaders by season
 List of National Basketball Association annual minutes leaders

References

Further reading
 Alex Sachare, 100 Greatest Basketball Players of all Time (1997)

External links
 
 Neil Johnston statistics on Basketball-Reference (as a player)
 Neil Johnston statistics on Basketball-Reference (as a coach)

1929 births
1978 deaths
American Basketball League (1961–62) coaches
American men's basketball coaches
American men's basketball players
Basketball coaches from Ohio
Basketball players from Ohio
Centers (basketball)
Naismith Memorial Basketball Hall of Fame inductees
National Basketball Association All-Stars
National Collegiate Basketball Hall of Fame inductees
Ohio State Buckeyes baseball players
Ohio State Buckeyes men's basketball players
Philadelphia Warriors head coaches
Philadelphia Warriors players
Pittsburgh Rens players
Portland Trail Blazers assistant coaches
Sportspeople from Chillicothe, Ohio
Undrafted National Basketball Association players
Wake Forest Demon Deacons men's basketball coaches
Eastern Basketball Association coaches